The Religious Zionists of America (Hebrew official name: Religious Zionists of America/Mizrachi-Hapoel Hamizrachi, also known as Mizrachi, is an American-based organization that is the official body for those, mostly Modern Orthodox Jews who identify with Religious Zionism and support the goals of the general Mizrachi movement in America, Europe and Israel.

Mizrachi (a Hebrew abbreviation of merkaz ruchani – “spiritual center”) was founded by Rabbi Isaac Jacob Reines in 1902 to serve as an umbrella organization for the Religious Zionist movement. In 1914, at a national conference in Cincinnati, Rabbi Meir Berlin (Bar-Ilan) oversaw the establishment of the American branch of the World Movement. The movement is inspired by the slogans of Mizrachi, “The Land of Israel, for the People of Israel, According to the Torah of Israel,” and Hapoel Hamizrachi, “Torah Va’Avodah” (Torah and Labor).

Most rabbis affiliated with Modern Orthodoxy's Rabbinical Council of America (RCA), who are mostly alumni of Yeshiva University's (YU) Rabbi Isaac Elchanan Theological Seminary (RIETS) are active members and leaders in the RZA so that there is a strong correlation of leadership between YU, the RCA, Mizrachi in general, and the RZA.

In honor of the 70th anniversary of the founding of the State of Israel, RZA partnered with World Mizrachi to bring 70 scholars to 70 communities in the United States. Named "70 for 70" this program had a significant impact on communities across the United States and reintroduced thousands of people to the RZA.

The RZA works on common Zionist agendas with similar non-Orthodox and non-religious organizations, such as the Zionist Organization of America, the Conference of Presidents of Major American Jewish Organizations, the American Israel Public Affairs Committee, B'nai B'rith, United Jewish Appeal, the Jewish National Fund and others.

The Presidium of the RZA is Dr. Ernest Agatstein, Martin Oliner and Rabbi Leonard A. Matanky, and the Chairman of the Board is Rabbi Solomon Ryback. RZA’s Executive Vice President that serves as chief executive for day-to-day operations is Rabbi Ari Rockoff.

See also
Bnei Akiva
Mizrachi (political party)
Mizrachi (Religious Zionism)
Hapoel HaMizrachi
Modern Orthodox Judaism
National Religious Party
Religious Zionism

References

External links
Official RZA website
Site of World Mizrachi Movement
Religious Zionists of America records; I-400; American Jewish Historical Society, New York, NY, and Boston, MA.

American Zionist Movement
Religious Zionist organizations
Zionism in the United States